Peter Tinniswood (21 December 1936 – 9 January 2003) was an English radio and TV comedy scriptwriter, and author of a series of popular novels. He was born in Liverpool, but grew up above a dry cleaner's on Eastway in Sale, Cheshire.

Early career
Tinniswood attended Sale Boys' Grammar School. His career began in journalism. He spent four years in Sheffield from 1958, first working for The Star, and then for the Sheffield Telegraph, where he was a leader writer and specialised in feature writing. He won widespread admiration for a week-long series Travels with a Donkey, an account of a tramp round the Peak District with a reluctant donkey.

Television and radio

In 1964, Tinniswood collaborated with his long-term writing partner David Nobbs on the BBC sketch show The Frost Report and the comedy Lance At Large, a sitcom starring Lance Percival in which Percival's character, Alan Day, was involved in different scenarios and meeting different people in each episode. The short-lived ITV series Never Say Die (1970) drew on Tinniswood's days as a hospital porter. Set in Victoria Memorial Hospital, the show focused on the comedy created between the patients and staff. It starred Reginald Marsh and Patrick Newell. 
Tinniswood based the BBC comedy I Didn't Know You Cared (1975–1979) on his novels. Featuring the Brandons, a dour northern family, the programme ran until 1979, and featured Liz Smith, Robin Bailey, John Comer and Stephen Rea. In 1980, the BBC produced a series based on other Tinniswood books, featuring the character the Brigadier, an erstwhile cricketer and over-the-top raconteur, played by Robin Bailey. Some of the stories were adapted for BBC Radio 4. The series was remade in 1985 for Channel 4.

For ITV in 1983, Tinniswood wrote The Home Front, again set in the north of England. It starred Brenda Bruce as Mrs Place, a nosey, arrogant mother who lorded it over her three children. Two years later ITV produced Mog, based on Peter's 1970 novel and starring Enn Reitel as the title character. The episodes were written by Ian La Frenais and Dick Clement, but it was not a success. Also in 1985, was South Of The Border starring Brian Glover as Edgar Rowley, a Yorkshireman forced to migrate to the south of England.

In later years, Tinniswood's output was mostly for Radio 4 and included the continuing adventures of Uncle Mort and Carter Brandon in Uncle Mort's North Country, Uncle Mort's South Country and Uncle Mort's Celtic Fringe and a series about poacher Winston Hayballs, his "bit of fluff" Nancy and her family adapted from his novel "Winston". Liz Goulding, his second wife, played Rosie.

A lifelong pipe smoker, Peter Tinniswood died of throat cancer at the age of 66. Since his death, the Writers' Guild of Great Britain and the Society of Authors have jointly administered in his memory the annual Tinniswood Award, to honour the best original radio drama script broadcast in the UK during the previous year, with a prize of £1500 for the winner.

TV credits
 That Was The Week That Was (1962)
 The Dick Emery Show (1963)
 Lance At Large (1964)
 The Frost Report (1966)
 Roy Hudd (1970)
 Never Say Die (1970)
 I Didn't Know You Cared (1975)
 Tales From A Long Room (1980) (BBC)
 The Home Front (1983)
 Mog (1985)
 South Of The Border (1985)
 Tales From A Long Room (1985) (Channel 4)
 Duck Patrol (1998)

Novels and other fiction

THE BRANDON FAMILY SERIES:
 A Touch Of Daniel (1968) – Winner of the Author's Club First Novel Award and Book of the Month choice
 Mog (1970)
 I Didn't Know You Cared (1973) – Winner of the Winifred Holtby Memorial Prize from the Royal Society of Literature for best regional novel.
 Except You're A Bird (1974)
 The Home Front (1982)
 Call it a Canary (1985)
 Uncle Mort’s North Country (1986)
 Uncle Mort’s South Country (1990)

CRICKETING TALES AND SKETCHES:
(A table of the individual pieces in these books is given at the foot of this section).
 Tales From A Long Room (1981)
 More Tales From A Long Room (1982)
 Collected Tales From A Long Room (1982) - a compilation of the above two titles
 The Brigadier Down Under (1983)
 The Brigadier In Season (1984)
 The Brigadier’s Brief Lives (1984)
 The Brigadier’s Tour (1985)
 The Brigadier's Collection (1986) - compilation [of 'Down Under' and 'In Season'?]
 Tales from Witney Scrotum (1987)
 Witney Scrotum (1995) - despite a similar title to the above, this is a different set of stories

HAYBALLS AND ITS SEQUEL:
 Hayballs (1989)
 Winston (1991)

OTHERS:
 The Stirk Of Stirk (1974)
 Shemerelda (1981)
 Dolly’s War (1987)

The books listed above under the heading Cricketing Tales And Sketches contain short stories and other humorous pieces as shown here:

Collected Tales From A Long Room - stories 1-13 are the same as 1-13 in Tales From A Long Room; stories 14-24 are the same as 1-11 in More Tales From A Long Room.

The Brigadier’s Brief Lives - contains the following short sketches:

Miss Petula Clark
Lord Carrington
Mr Rupert Murdoch
Mr Richard Baker
Sir John Mills
Mr Ray Buckton
Mr E. W. Swanton
Lord Wilson
Mr Kevin Keegan
Mr Norman St John Stevas
Sir Douglas Bader
Mr Roy Jenkins
Sir Robin Day
Miss Jan Leeming
Prince Philip
Mr Andrew Lloyd-Webber
Lord Goodman
Miss Jilly Cooper
The Duke of Westminster
Mr David Frost
Mr Laurie McMenamy
The Village Tea Lady
Miss Esther Tantzen
Andrew Previn
Lord Lichfield
Mr Geoffrey Boycott
Mrs Mary Whitehouse
Sir Richard Attenborough
Mr Robert Robinson
Mr Winston Churchill
Lord Longford
Mr Michael Parkinson
Mr Terry Wogan
Mr David Attenborough
Mr Roy Plomley
Mr Sebastian Coe
Miss Pamela Stephenson
Mr Arthur Scargill
Mr Roy Hattersley
Mr Ian Paisley
Cardinal Hume
Mr Ian Botham
Mr Michael Foot
Mr H. D. 'Dicky' Bird
Mr Frank Muir
Earl Spencer
Mr Jimmy Hill
Mr Leon Brittan
Mr Jimmy Saville OBE
Miss Elizabeth Jane Howard
Mr Tony Benn
Mr Tom Stoppard
Mr Bob Willis
Mr Barry Took
Miss Britt Ekland
Sir Peter Hall
Sir Geoffrey Howe
Mr James Cameron
Lord Lucan
Mr Ned Sherrin
The Archbishop of Canterbury
Princess Margaret
Miss Jean Rook
Mr Norman Tebbitt
Mr Mick Jagger
Mr Patrick Moore
Doctor David Owen
Mr Jimmy Young
Sir Anthont Blunt
Mr Clive Jenkins
Mr Enoch Powell
Lady Falklander
Miss Jan Morris
Mr Ludovic Kennedy
Mr Brian Redhead
Mr Brian Johnson
Mr Reginald Bosanquet
Mr Auberon Waugh
Mr Bill Sowerbutts
Mr Jim Laker
Mr Jackie Stewart
Lord Kagan
Sir Harold Macmillan
Mr John Wells
Mrs Shirley Williams
Mr Henry Cooper
Mr John Lennon
Mr Neil Kinnock
Captain Mark Phillips
Mr Winston Place
Dame Vera Lynn
Mr Feliks Topolski
Mr Alan Ayckbourn
Sir John Hackett

The Brigadier’s Tour - contains the following 116 short sketches:

The Introduction

The Captain: • Mr W. H. Wooller

The Vice-Captain: • Mr D. J. Insole

The Opening Batsmen: • Mr W. Place  • Sir J. B. Hobbs  • Mr J. B. Stollmeyer  • Mr H. L. Collins  • Mr W. Rhodes  • Mr W. M. Lawry  • Mr A. Jones  • Mr S. M. Gavaskar  • Mr A. R. Morris  • Mr A. C. Maclaren  • Mr F. A. Lowson  • Mr Hanif Mohammed  • Mr R. T. Simpson  • Mr C. Milburn  • Mr G. Boycott  • Mr T. Meale

The Specialist Batsmen: • Mr F. R. Spofforth  • Mr K. C. Bland  • Mr E. de C. Weekes  • Mr W. Watson  • Mr C. B. Fry  • Mr I. R. Redpath  • Mr M. P. Donnelly  • Mr C. H. Lloyd  • Mr G. Gunn  • Mr D. I. Gower  • Sir D. G. Bradman  • Mr G. R. Viswanath  • Mr D. C. S. Compton  • Mr A. D. Nourse  • Nawab of Pataudi  • Mr P. M. Roebuck  • Mr V. T. Trumper  • Mr I. V. A. Richards  • Mr J. E. P. McMaster  • Mr R. H. Spooner  • Brigadier-General R. M. Poore  • Mr D. W. Randall  • Mr Z. Abbas  • Mr K. D. Mackay  • Mr G. L. Jessop  • Charles Lawrence, Mullagh, Dick-A-Dick, Twopenny, Red Cap, Mosquito, King Cole, Peter, Cuzens, Tiger, Jim Crow, Bullocky,  Dumas, Sundown  • Mr D. B. Close  • Mr R. L. Dias  • Mr C. L. Walcott  • Mr T. W. Hayward  • Rt Rev D. S. Sheppard  • Mr R. N. Harvey  • Mr T. W. Graveney  • Sir P. F. Warner  • Mr A. R. Lewis  • Mr A. R. Border  • Mr H. Pilling

The All Rounders: • Mr W. G. Grace  • Mr R. G. Garlick  • Mr R. Benaud  • Mr G. H. Hirst  • Lord Constantine, Baron of Maraval and Nelson  • Mr M. A. Noble  • Mr R. M. Kapil Dev  • Sir G. St. A. Sobers  • Mr P. M. Walker  • Mr M. J. Procter  • Mr A. E. Trott  • Mr F. E. Woolley  • Sir F. M. M. Worrell  • Mr W. R. Hammond  • Mr I. T. Botham

The Fast Bowlers: • Mr J. B. Statham  • Mr J. Barton King  • Mr H. Larwood  • Mr D. K. Lillee  • Mr Fazal Mahmood  • Mr R. V. Divecha  • Mr W. Voce  • Mr R. R. Lindwall  • Mr W. J. O'Reilly  • Mr R. G. D. Willis  • Mr E. A. McDonald  • Mr M. W. Tate  • Mr T. Richardson  • Mr I. J. Jones  • Mr J. M. Gregory  • Mr R. J. Hadlee  • Mr F. E. Rumsey  • Sir C. A. Smith

The Spinners: • Mr D. J. Shepherd  • Mr C. V. Grimmett  • Mr R. Peel  • Mr P. H. Edmonds  • Mr B. S. Bedi  • Mr R. Tattersall  • Mr J. E. Emburey  • Mr H. J. Tayfield  • Mr S. Ramadhin  • Mr J. C. White  • Mr D. V. P. Wright  • Mr J. Briggs  • Mr J. C. Laker  • Mr L. R. Gibbs  • Mr C. H. Parkin  • Mr H. Verity  • Mr Abdul Qadir  • Mr C. Blythe

The Greatest Bowler Of Them All: • Mr S. F. Barnes

The Wicket Keepers: • Mr D. Tallon  • Mr R. W. Marsh  • Mr F. M. Engineer  • Mr R. W. Taylor  • Mr J. R. Reid  • Mr J. G. Binks  • Mr W. H. V. Levett

The Replacements: • The Replacements.

Radio credits

Radio drama
(snt = BBC Saturday-Night Theatre; aft = BBC Afternoon Theatre, m = monologue)

1964 Hardluck Hall (6 x 30m, series of comedy plays) 
1973 Sam's Wedding (aft) 
1980 A Gifted Child (aft) 
1981 An Occasional Day (aft) 
1981 Stoker Leishman's Diaries (snt) 
1981 The Siege 
1981 The Bargeman's Comfort 
1985 Crossing the Frontier
1987 A Touch Of Daniel (snt) 
1987 The Village Fete rpt. 1988 (snt) 
1990 A Small Union 
1992 Tales from the Brigadier 
1992 Two into Three
1993 The Governor's Consort (for M. Wimbush) R3 
1995 Pen Pals
1997 Secret life of the Shed–feature on shed life–with P.Tinniswood 
1997 Batteries not included-feature on batteries-with P.Tinniswood 
1997 A Very Rare Bird Indeed 
1998 The Last Obituary (for Billie Whitelaw;m),rpt 1999 
1998 Visiting Julia: 6-episode comedy drama series 
1998 Next time we might play better
1998 The wireless lady 
1998 On the whole it's been jolly good (for Maurice Denham;m),rpt.1999 
1998 Verona-a conspiracy of parrots (for Stephanie Cole;m),rpt 1999 
1999 The House Swap 
1999 The Scan
2000 Dorothy, a Manager's wife
2000 Age Gap 
2000 The Packer 
2000 Admiral of the night 
2000 Monument (adapted from Eduardo De Filippo), dram. 
2001 The Duvet Lady (Billie Whitelaw monologue) 
2001 Mr. Reliable
2001 Tales from the backbench (series 1, 4 episodes)
2001 On the train from Chemnitz
2001 Tales from the Backbench (series 2, 4 episodes)
2002 On the whole it's been jolly good, rpt  
2002 The Air Raid 
2002 Anton in Eastbourne (for Paul Scofield) 
2003 The Goalkeeper's Boo-Boo
2010 The Visitor (BBC Radio 4 7.10.2010, Roy Hudd and Emma Fielding)

Serials
(numbers show no. of episodes) 

Home Again 6 (R4 2.6.1980– 7.7.1980 Robin Bailey/Doreen Mantle/Liz Goulding/David Troughton/Christopher Benjamin)
Uncle Mort's North Country 5 (R4 21.7.1988 -18.8.1988 Stephen Thorne/Peter Skellern/Christian Rodska)
Winston 6 (R4 26.4.1989– 31.5.1989 Maurice Denham/Christian Rodska/Shirley Dixon/Liz Goulding/Bill Wallis)
Winston Comes To Town 6 (R4 1.1.1990– 5.2.1990 Maurice Denham/Shirley Dixon/Liz Goulding/Christian Rodska/Bill Wallis)
Uncle Mort's South Country – Series 1 5 (R4 12.7.1990 9.8.1990 Stephen Thorne/Sam Kelly/Liz Goulding/Christian Rodska)
Uncle Mort's South Country – Series 2 5 (R4 27.10.1990 -24.11.1990 Stephen Thorne/Sam Kelly/Liz Goulding/Christopher Good/Christian Rodska) 
Winston In Love 6 (R4 31.12.1990 -4.2.1991 Shirley Dixon/Bill Wallis/Maurice Denham/Liz Goulding/Christian Rodska)
Winston In Europe 6 (R4 12.3.1992 -16.4.1992 Shirley Dixon/Maurice Denham/Liz Goulding/Christian Rodska/Bill Wallis)
Winston Back Home 6 (R4 31.3.1994 -5.5.1994 Shirley Dixon/Maurice Denham/Liz Goulding/Christian Rodska/Bill Wallis)
Uncle Mort's Celtic Fringe 5 (R4 12.2.1996 -11.3.1996 Stephen Thorne/Sam Kelly/Christian Rodska/Liz Goulding)

External links
 
 Peter Tinniswood at 'Diversity' – radio writing for the BBC.
 BBC Guide to Comedy – information about shows to which Peter Tinniswood contributed.
 News of death (BBC)

References

1936 births
2003 deaths
Deaths from cancer in England
Deaths from esophageal cancer
Novelists from Liverpool
People from Sale, Greater Manchester
English male dramatists and playwrights
20th-century English dramatists and playwrights
People educated at Sale Grammar School
20th-century English male writers